Venustraphobia is the debut album by the rock band Casbah Club, released in 2006. The album uses many of Simon Townshend's well received solo songs. The term venustraphobia supposedly means the fear of beautiful women.

Track listing
All songs by Casbah Club, if not noted:

Personnel
Casbah Club
Simon Townshend - Lead vocals, guitar, keyboards
Bruce Foxton - Bass guitar, backing vocals
Bruce Watson - Guitar, E-bow
Mark Brzezicki - Drums, percussion, backing vocals
Production
 Simon Townshend - Producer: 
 Patrick Bird - Engineers
 Wes Maebe - Engineers
 Kenny Denton - Mixing (except "Any Way She Moves", mixed by Myles Clark at Eel Pie Studios)

External links
Official Casbah Club website
Casbah Club Myspace

2006 debut albums
Casbah Club albums